Patrícia "Chuca" de Oliveira Ferreira (born March 21, 1979 in Mauá) is a Brazilian basketball player. At the 2008 and 2012 Summer Olympics, she competed for the Brazil women's national basketball team in the women's event.

References

1979 births
Living people
People from Mauá
Brazilian women's basketball players
Olympic basketball players of Brazil
Basketball players at the 2008 Summer Olympics
Basketball players at the 2012 Summer Olympics
Sportspeople from São Paulo (state)